Haji Omeran, is a town located in Iraqi Kurdistan's Arbil province near the Iran–Iraq border. It is 180 kilometers northeast of the Arbil and 20 kilometers east of the Choman. The town is inhabited by Kurds.

See also
Operation Dawn 2
Operation Karbala-7
Iraqi chemical weapons program

References

External links
 Iraq-businessnews
 Haji Omran: Iraq (Source questionable as it falsely claims that it's in As Sulaymānīyah, but the coordinate is clearly farther north, in Arbīl)
 Hawlergov (Arabic language)

Populated places in Erbil Governorate